The Oceanic and Oriental Navigation Company, sometimes shortened to O & O, was an American shipping company that operated from 1928 to 1938. The company was a joint venture between Matson Navigation Company and the American-Hawaiian Steamship Company.

In 1927, Swayne & Hoyt Lines, a San Francisco-based shipping company, was operating the American-Australian-Orient Line cargo service with ships under charter from the United States Shipping Board (USSB). The American-Australian-Orient Line sailed between ports in the California to ports in Australia, New Zealand, and China. When Swayne & Hoyt's financial difficulties hindered their operation of the USSB ships, the Oceanic and Oriental Navigation Company was formed as a joint venture between the American-Hawaiian Steamship Company and Oceanic-Matson, a subsidiary of Matson Navigation Company, with each company holding a 50% stake in Oceanic and Oriental. Oceanic-Matson operated the California – Australia – New Zealand routes, while the American-Hawaiian Steamship Company operated the routes to China.

By 1938, Oceanic and Oriental had ceased operations.

References

Bibliography 
 

Transport companies established in 1928
Defunct shipping companies of the United States
Companies based in San Francisco
1938 disestablishments in California
Defunct companies based in the San Francisco Bay Area
1928 establishments in California
Transport companies disestablished in 1938